Mujović is a Serbian surname. Notable people with the surname include:

 Božica Mujović (born 1996), Montenegrin basketball player
 Ilda Mujović (born 1993), Montenegrin footballer
 Vjera Mujović (born 1972), Serbian actress

Serbian surnames